Rebecca was a raccoon kept as a pet by US president Calvin Coolidge and First Lady Grace Coolidge.

Rebecca came from Mississippi.
She had been sent to the White House to be served for the 1926 Thanksgiving dinner. Since the 1913 death of Horace Vose, the traditional provider of the White House Thanksgiving turkey, numerous farmers had been angling to provide the President's Thanksgiving meal, and despite Coolidge's requests to stop the practice in 1923, the unsolicited gifts continued and became increasingly unusual, with the live raccoon being the furthest out of the ordinary fare. Coolidge, who had never eaten raccoon and had no appetite to try it, kept Rebecca as a pet instead.

For Christmas, an embroidered collar was made for Rebecca, inscribed with the title "White House Raccoon". She enjoyed participating in the annual White House Easter egg roll.  She was fed shrimp and persimmons, and eggs were a favorite. Rebecca was let loose in the White House and walked on a leash outdoors. At times, she could be mischievous, and was known to unscrew lightbulbs, open cabinets and unpot houseplants.

As First Lady Grace wrote:

In March 1927, during a White House renovation, Coolidge brought Rebecca to his temporary quarters in a Dupont Circle mansion. When the Coolidges took a vacation in the Black Hills, they brought Rebecca along in a basket, together with two of their dogs, Rob Roy and Prudence Prim as well as five canaries on the 1,800-mile railroad journey. In preparation for leaving the White House at the end of the president's term in 1929, the Coolidges donated Rebecca to the zoological quarters in Rock Creek Park (now the National Zoo) in Washington, DC. However, Rebecca "failed to adapt to zoo life and died shortly thereafter".

Other animals 
As a companion for Rebecca, Reuben, a male raccoon, was acquired by a White House police officer. Reuben frequently escaped, being recovered by White House staff; however, he ultimately disappeared without a trace.
Grace Coolidge wrote about the incident:

Herbert Hoover was next to occupy the White House; soon thereafter, a wild opossum moved into Rebecca's vacant tree-house and was adopted by the Hoovers and named Billy Possum.

See also

 United States presidential pets
 National Thanksgiving Turkey Presentation

References

Raccoons in popular culture
Calvin Coolidge
United States presidential pets
Individual mammals